The Nels Severson Barn, also known as "Fort" Severson, is a historic barn located north of Carpenter in rural Mitchell County, Iowa, United States. It is a two-story structure composed of irregularly-cut limestone with a gable roof. It is one of a few, and possibly the only, stone structure in the area. The barn was built by Norwegian immigrant Nels Severson in 1867. He and his brother Ole were early settlers in this region. Local tradition refers to the building as a fort. Its large size and sturdy construction would protect the white settlers from Indian attacks. It is also said that it was a stop on a stage coach line. While the latter might be true, there is no evidence to corroborate either tradition. The barn was listed on the National Register of Historic Places in 1977.

References

Infrastructure completed in 1867
Barns on the National Register of Historic Places in Iowa
National Register of Historic Places in Mitchell County, Iowa
Buildings and structures in Mitchell County, Iowa